Símun (or Simon), was, around the year 1350, lawman of the Faroe Islands

References
G. V. C. Young: Færøerne - fra vikingetiden til reformationen. København 1982. s. 88

Lawmen of the Faroe Islands
Year of birth unknown
Year of death unknown